Louis Thomas Fratto (July 17, 1907 – November 24, 1967), born Luigi Tommaso Giuseppe Fratto, also known as "Lew Farrell" and "Cock-eyed", was an American labor racketeer and organized crime figure in Chicago, Illinois and Des Moines, Iowa from the 1930s to 1967.  In 1939, Fratto replaced Charles "Cherry Nose" Gioe as the Mob Boss of Iowa, making his headquarters in Des Moines.  He was later implicated in the murder of Gioe, who went back to Chicago, but who later tried to reclaim his control over the rackets in Iowa. Among other things, Fratto became the Iowa distributor of "Canadian Ace Beer" which was a Capone Family enterprise.

Fratto was the brother of Frank "Frankie One Ear" Fratto, a hitman for the mob, the uncle of Rudy Fratto, Jr. and Gill Vlerio, and a cousin to alleged hitman, bagman, enforcer and short-lived Chicago front boss, Felix "Milwaukee Phil" Alderisio.

Whilst in Iowa Fratto lived and operated under the alias "Lew Farrell"; he claimed that he took the name as a young man when he was a boxer. In the early 1950s Fratto/Farrell was subpoenaed by the Kefauver Organized Crime Senate Committee where he pleaded the Fifth Amendment. Although Fratto was never convicted of any crime, he was under a federal indictment for racketeering at the time of his death in 1967.

Fratto had five children with wife Carmella: Tommy, Frank, Johnny, Carmie, Willie, and one daughter Delores with his first wife, Evelyn. Among Fratto's children, Frank Farrell was a passenger along with Rocky Marciano on the 1969 Cessna crash which killed them and the pilot. Johnny Fratto was a frequent guest on the Howard Stern Show, managed Eric the Actor and also guest starred in an episode of Deadliest Warrior as an expert on Al Capone.

References

External links

"Louis Fratto - The Mob's Invisible Man (The Original Teflon Don) mafia." MidwestMafia.com

1907 births
1967 deaths
American gangsters of Italian descent
Chicago Outfit mobsters